Countess Margaret of Hanau-Münzenberg (6 April 1471 – 5 September 1503 in Worms) was a daughter of Count Philip I of Hanau-Münzenberg and his wife, Countess Adriana of Nassau-Siegen.

Her family negotiated her entry into the Liebenau monastery as early as 1477, and she was accepted there as a nun.

Correspondence between her and her father has been preserved, which shows that she still took an interest in the affairs of her family after she entered the convent.

Ancestors

References 
 Karl-Heinz Spieß: Familie und Verwandtschaft im deutschen Hochadel des Spätmittelalters, Stuttgart 1993
 Reinhard Suchier: Philipp I. von Hanau-Münzenberg, in: Hanauer Anzeiger of 18 and 19 November 1897 = vols. 270 and 271
 Ernst J. Zimmermann: Hanau Stadt und Land'', 3rd ed., Hanau, 1919, reprinted 1978.

Footnotes 

People from Worms, Germany
House of Hanau
1471 births
1503 deaths
15th-century German people
15th-century German women
Countesses of Hanau-Münzenberg